Saint Joseph's may refer to:

Places
 St. Joseph's, Newfoundland and Labrador, a Canadian town
 St. Joseph's, Saskatchewan, a Canadian hamlet
 Saint Joseph's Oratory, Montreal, Quebec, Canada

Hospitals
 St. Joseph's Health Centre, a hospital in Toronto, Ontario, Canada
St. Joseph's Hospital and Medical Center in Phoenix, Arizona, United States of America

Education
 Saint Joseph's University, Philadelphia, Pennsylvania, United States
Saint Joseph's Hawks, the athletic teams at Saint Joseph's University
 St. Joseph's School (disambiguation)
 Saint Joseph's College (disambiguation)
 Saint Joseph Academy (disambiguation)
 St. Joseph's Convent School, Sagar
 Saint Joseph's Institution, a secondary school in Singapore
 Former Saint Joseph's Institution, now a museum in Singapore
 Collège Saint-Joseph de Hull, a private secondary school for girls in Gatineau, Quebec
 St Joseph Higher Secondary School, Dhaka

Churches
 List of churches named after Saint Joseph
 St. Joseph's Cathedral (disambiguation)

See also
Saint Joseph (disambiguation)
Josephology
Joseph's Tomb, in the West Bank city of Nablus